Prophecy I:  The Viking Child (shortened to  Viking Child on some systems) is a video game created by Imagitec Design Limited for the Atari ST, Amiga, Atari Lynx, Game Boy, and MS-DOS compatible operating systems in 1991. The Atari ST original was programmed by Mark Fisherwith with graphics by Anthony Rosbottom and music by Barry Leitch and Ian Howe.

Ports to the Game Gear, Master System, and Commodore 64 were cancelled. A planned sequel, Viking Child 2, was not released.

Plot
This video game was based on a Viking Child called Brian who must enter the Halls of Valhalla and do battle against the evil god Loki and his minions.

Gameplay
The game closely resembled Sega's Wonder Boy in Monster Land, as certain elements like collecting hidden gold, upgrading the character's weapons and visiting shops were practically identical, despite the difference in release times.

There is no save game feature but  passwords can be earned and used to allow access to later levels.

Reception

Robert A. Jung reviewed the Lynx version of the game which was posted to IGN. In his final verdict he wrote "While Viking Child is a pleasant diversion, it is missing the refinements needed for greatness. The biggest appeal is in exploring the land and just trying to survive, but it should not be mistaken for an adventure game. Still, if you're looking for something that's a little more than the typical run-and-jump title, Viking Child is worth a try." Giving a final score of 7 out of 10.

Raze Magazine reviewed the Amiga and Atari ST versions of the game in December 1990.

References

External links

1991 video games
Amiga games
Atari games
Atari ST games
Atari Lynx games
Game Boy games
DOS games
Cancelled Commodore 64 games
Cancelled Game Gear games
Cancelled Master System games
Imagitec Design games
Piko Interactive games
Video games based on Norse mythology
Video games developed in the United Kingdom
Video games set in the Viking Age